Holliday with Mulligan is an album by American singer Judy Holliday with jazz saxophonist and bandleader Gerry Mulligan featuring performances recorded in 1961 which were first released on the DRG label in 1980.

Reception

Scott Yanow, writing for AllMusic, stated: "Baritone-saxophonist Gerry Mulligan and actress Judy Holliday were an 'item' around the time of this recording. Their one meeting on record features Holliday doing some effective singing on eleven songs, mostly lesser-known standards plus four songs co-written by the two leaders. Unfortunately Mulligan's Concert Jazz Band is largely wasted, being restricted to anonymous accompaniment of Holliday, making this CD of greater historical value than of interest to jazz listeners".

Track listing
 "What's the Rush" (Mulligan, Holliday) – 3:26
 "Loving You" (Mulligan, Holliday) – 2:13
 "Lazy" (Irving Berlin) – 2:27
 "It Must Be Christmas" (Mulligan, Holliday) – 3:02
 "The Party's Over" (Jule Styne, Adolph Green, Betty Comden) – 2:26
 "It's Bad For Me" (Cole Porter) – 2:09
 "Supper Time" (Berlin) – 4:14
 "Pass That Peace Pipe" (Roger Edens, Hugh Martin, Ralph Blane) – 2:59
 "I Gotta Right to Sing the Blues" (Harold Arlen, Ted Koehler) – 2:52
 "Summer's Over" (Mulligan, Holliday) – 3:47
 "Blue Prelude" (Gordon Jenkins, Joe Bishop) – 3:17

Personnel
Judy Holliday – vocals
Gerry Mulligan – baritone saxophone
Alex De Risi, Don Ferrara, Nick Travis – trumpet
Bob Brookmeyer – valve trombone, arranger
Alan Raph – bass trombone
Earl Chapin, Fred Klein, Gunther Schuller – French horn
Walter Levinsky – alto saxophone, clarinet
Al Klink – tenor saxophone, flute
Donald Ashworth – saxophone, oboe
Gene Allen – baritone saxophone, bass clarinet
Bernie Leighton – piano
Bill Crow – bass
Mel Lewis – drums
Ralph Burns, Al Cohn, Bill Finegan – arranger

References

Gerry Mulligan albums
1980 albums
Albums arranged by Ralph Burns